Krøttøya is an island in Harstad Municipality in Troms og Finnmark county, Norway. The  island is the northernmost inhabited island in the Andfjorden. It is located in the Meløyvær archipelago, consisting of 365 small islands, with over 20 white-sand beaches. Several other islands are connected to Krøttøya by road, but the island group is only accessible by boat. Krøttøy is surrounded by the large islands of Senja to the east, Bjarkøya and Grytøya to the south, and Andøya to the west.

Flora and fauna
During the winter season (October–March) large schools of herring arrive in Andfjorden, followed by orcas, humpback whales, and fin whales. Sperm whales and pilot whales are encountered all year round.

Attractions and activities
The main attractions are Viking graves and the Meløyvær fortress which is a national museum. The island was of great strategic importance during the Cold War thus holding back a possible naval attack of the Soviet Navy on the supply lines and defence positions of the Norwegian Army in Northern Norway. At full capacity, it had stationed up to 450 soldiers of the Norwegian Army. In 2002 the army left the fort and since then visitors from outside are allowed in the fort without security clearances. Some of the bunkers and military buildings are now privately owned. Valhall, an ex-military summer residence was renovated in 2007 and now serves as a hotel. The main activities are whale watching, sea eagle safaris, fishing, sea kayaking, and diving.

Gallery

Transport
Krøttøy is inhabited year-round by a few people and in the summer its population increases dramatically. It is connected daily by a catamaran operated by Boreal Transport with the islands of Bjarkøya and Senja and with the town of Harstad. There is also a bridge connecting Krøttøya with Meløyvær.

References

External links
Aerial images of Krøttøya and Meløyvær on Panoramio, by Lasse Tur
Valhall

Harstad
Islands of Troms og Finnmark